Muzeum Ziemi Szprotawskiej, established  2000 by Towarzystwo Bory Dolnośląskie. It is the local center for historical and archeological research pertaining to the old Szprotawa District, for the towns of Szprotawa, Małomice, Przemków and Niegosławice.

In the museum structure are included: archaeology with history, archive, nature and tourism.
The stable exhibitions concern general: The Stone Age, Bronze Age, Middle Ages, Iron Age and Modern Times (Germans and Soviets in Szprotawa).

The most important exhibits are:
 A peculiar sword from the 16th century
 An anonymous chronicle of district Szprotawa from the 18th century
 A dowry coffer from the 18th century
 A bomber ball (projectile) from the 15th century
 Some urns dating from prehistoric times
 A gravestone of Vogdt from the 18th century
 Heavy machine guns from the former World War II German military airport Sprottau.

Apart from its educational mission, the museum's most important work is carrying out investigations of the Silesia Walls, earthen structures running for quite a distance in the surrounding countryside, the earthen remnants of the Chrobry fortified town, the Flins, the Sprottau Castle, and the Battle of Primkenau of 1015.

Gallery 

Museums in Lubusz Voivodeship
Żagań County
History museums in Poland